WYGA-CD, virtual channel 16 (UHF digital channel 29), is a low-powered, Class A beIN Sports Xtra-affiliated television station licensed to Atlanta, Georgia, United States. The station is owned by HC2 Holdings and licensed to HC2 LPTV Holdings.

History
Originally granted the callsign W07CP in November 1997, it became W55CR in December 1998, broadcasting on channel 55. The station then was granted the call letters WDAH-CA from January 2004 to July 2005.  After a change in ownership, the station changed call letters and became WYGA-CA.  In filings with the Federal Communications Commission, WYGA-CA had been forced to cease operations on a full-time basis on its allocated channel 55 due to issues with its transmit site, likely due to MediaFLO subscription mobile TV using the same channel, or nearby W55BM, or both. The station's call sign was changed to the current WYGA-CD on May 27, 2014.

In 2009, the FCC required U.S. television stations to vacate channels 52-69, which have been removed from the UHF TV bandplan and reassigned for other purposes.  Consequently, WYGA-CA, which had been operating on channel 55, had applied to the FCC for the displacement channel 45.  The channel 45 application was disputed by WGCL-TV (channel 46) because it is an adjacent channel, causing RF interference in certain areas.  However, WGCL opted to keep its allocated digital channel 19 after the DTV transition, thus eliminating the adjacent-channel interference situation from WYGA-CA on channel 45.

In order to avoid losing the authorization on channel 45 due to a statutory 12-month cutoff, WYGA-CA had been broadcasting on a special temporary authorization on channel 45 at a low power (2 kW ERP) until WGCL ended its analog nightlight period on June 26.  Its application is for 150 kW in the direction of beam tilt, equivalent to 115 kW in the horizontal plane.  The directional antenna produces a kidney shape, with the major lobes of its antenna pattern toward the north-northeast and west-southwest.

The station was granted a construction permit for WYGA-LD on channel 16, from the same location as analog 45, which is on the same tower as WUPA TV 43 (69.1) in the southern part of the Reynoldstown neighborhood and southeast of Cabbagetown along Interstate 20 and Memorial Drive.  The antenna pattern is similar, but has less of a null toward the northwest.  First issued in 2006, it was modified in late April 2009, and expires in late October 2009.

WYGA-CA signed off March 5, 2009 in the wake of the bankruptcy of owner Equity Media Holdings.  In the auction that followed on April 16, WYGA was sold to Mako Communications.  The sale closed on June 30, 2009.

WYGA-LD started digital broadcasting on channel 16 from September 5, 2009, though it had been testing prior to that. The digital signal was multiplexed into four digital subchannels: 16.1, 16.2, 16.3, and 16.4. The only active channel with programming was 16.2, carrying the AMGTV network, although the station initially carried White Springs Television when it first signed on.

In late September 2009, the station applied to the FCC to change its digital broadcast channel to 18 (vacated by analog WNGH-TV in northwest Georgia), due to higher-than-expected co-channel interference from WGXA-TV in Macon, Georgia on channel 16.  WYGA-LD's permit for channel 18 is for the same broadcast power, transmitting from the same tower at a slightly different elevation and with a slightly different antenna pattern.

In June 2013, WYGA-LD was slated to be sold to Landover 5 LLC as part of a larger deal involving 51 other low-power television stations; the sale fell through in June 2016.

Mako Communications sold its stations, including WYGA-CD, to HC2 Holdings in 2017.

Digital channels

References

External links
WYGA official website

Innovate Corp.
YGA-CD
Television channels and stations established in 1990
Low-power television stations in the United States